The Louisville Cardinals (also known as the Cards) are the NCAA athletic teams representing the University of Louisville. The Cardinals teams play in the Atlantic Coast Conference, beginning in the 2014 season. While playing in the Big East Conference from 2005 through 2013, the Cardinals captured 17 regular season Big East titles and 33 Big East Tournament titles totaling 50 Big East Championships across all sports. On November 28, 2012, Louisville received and accepted an invitation to join the Atlantic Coast Conference and became a participating member in all sports in 2014. In 2016, Lamar Jackson won the school its first Heisman Trophy.

Since 2000 Louisville is the only NCAA team to win a BCS bowl game; to appear in the NCAA Division I men's basketball Final Four, the College World Series, and the NCAA Division I women's basketball Final Four; and to finish as runner-up in the Men's soccer College Cup. It is one of only six schools that has appeared more than once in each of the following events—a BCS bowl game, the men's and women's basketball Final Fours, and the College World Series—and Louisville's span of seven school years (2006–07 to 2012–13) is the shortest among these schools. Also, it is the first school ever to win a BCS bowl game, appear in the men's and women's basketball Final Fours, and appear in the College World Series in the same school year, doing so in 2012–13.

U of L finished the 2015–16 year ranked 29th in the NACDA Learfield Sports Directors' Cup. The 2015–16 season began with Louisville ranked 24th through the final fall standings.

Varsity teams 
UofL competes in 21 intercollegiate varsity sports: Men's sports include baseball, basketball, cross country, football, golf, soccer, swimming & diving, tennis and track & field; while women's sports include basketball, cross country, field hockey, golf, lacrosse, rowing, soccer, softball, swimming & diving, tennis, track & field and volleyball.

Baseball

 Team Established: 1909
 All Time Record: 1,874–1,484–10
 Playing Facility: Jim Patterson Stadium (2005)
 Head Coach: Dan McDonnell
 NCAA Tournament Appearances: 13
 Last NCAA Appearance: 2019
 College World Series Appearances: 5 (2007, 2013, 2014, 2017, 2019)
 Super Regional Appearances: 8 (2007, 2009, 2013, 2014, 2015, 2016, 2017, 2019)
 Conference Titles: 10
 Conference Tournament Titles: 2
 Drafted Players: 50
 Players In The MLB system: 5

The 2006 Baseball Cardinals broke the Big East Conference Tournament record with a .409 batting average.

In 2007, the Cardinals finished the season with a 47–24 record and ranked as high as 6th in some major polls while advancing to the College World Series for the first time in school history.

Men's basketball

 Team Established: 1911
 All Time Record: 1,825–915 (66.6%)
 Playing Facility: KFC Yum! Center (2010)
 Court: Denny Crum Court (2007)
 Head Coach: Mike Pegues (Interim)
 NCAA Men's Basketball Championships: 3 (1980, 1986, 2013)
 NCAA Final Fours: 10 
 NCAA tournament Appearances: 43
 Last NCAA Tournament Appearance: 2019
 Conference regular season Championships: 23 (7 Missouri Valley Conference, 12 Metro Conference, 1 Conference USA, 2 Big East, 1 American Athletic Conference)
 Conference Tournament Champions: 19 (2 Kentucky Intercollegiate Athletic Conference, 11 Metro Conference, 2 Conference USA, 3 Big East, 1 American Athletic Conference)
 NIT Appearances: 15 (Won 1956 NIT Championship)
 All-Americans: 21
 Drafted Players: 70
 Players In The NBA: 6 (Gorgui Dieng, Montrezl Harrell, Damion Lee, Donovan Mitchell, Terry Rozier, Ray Spalding)

UofL's basketball tradition was established by Muhlenberg County native, Coach Bernard "Peck" Hickman. The Cards never had a losing season in Hickman's 23 years, prior to his arrival the team had only had 11 winning seasons. In 1956, Hickman's team won the NIT, then considered a national championship on a par with the NCAA tournament. After retiring, Hickman became the school's Athletics Director and hired then John Wooden assistant and future Hall of Famer Denny Crum, who led the team to two NCAA Division I basketball championships (1980 and 1986) and six Final Fours. The men's basketball team currently ranks fifth in all-time NCAA tournament wins and has been in the top-five in average attendance each year since the 1982–83 season. Perennial rivals include the University of Kentucky, University of Cincinnati, and the University of Memphis.

Women's basketball

The team was established in 1975.
 All Time Record : 876–491 (64.1%) 
 Playing facility: KFC Yum! Center (2010)
 Head coach: Jeff Walz (401-108 in fifteen seasons)
 Conference titles: 10 (1983–84, 1991–92, 1992–93, 1996–97, 1998–99, 2000–01, 2017-18, 2018-19, 2019-20, 2020-21)
 Conference Tournament titles: 8 (1978, 1979, 1980, 1981, 1983, 1984, 1993, 2018)
 NCAA appearances: 24
 Last NCAA appearance: 2022 
 All-Americans: 6
 Drafted players: 19 (including 2009 #1 pick Angel McCoughtry 2014 first-rounder Shoni Schimmel and 2019 #2 pick Asia Durr)
 Final Four appearances: 4 (2009,2013,2018,2022)

Cheerleading

The cheerleading squads have won multiple championships with the large co-ed squad coached by James Speed winning 18 National Cheerleaders Association Collegiate National championships (1985–86, 1989, 1992, 1994, 1996, 1998–99, 2003–09, 2011, 2016, 2018), the all-girl squad coached by Misty Hodges winning 18 championships (2001–05, 2007–09, 2011–12, 2014–2019, no competition 2020, 2021-22) and the small co-ed cheerleading squad winning 12 championships (2005–06, 2008–09, 2011, 2013–17, 2021–22). The University of Louisville Spirit Groups hold more national titles than any other sport offered at the university.

The Cardinal Bird Mascot also falls under the jurisdiction of the University of Louisville Spirit Groups. The "Bird" also competes with the cheerleaders in national competitions and makes regular appearances in the Louisville Metro Area.

Cross country

Men's CC
 2006: Finished 15th at NCAA Championships
 2007: Finished 9th at NCAA Championships
 Conference titles: 2 (2007, 2013)

Women's CC
 Conference titles: 1 (1996)

Field hockey
 Team Established: 1927
 All Time Record: 334–373-16 (.462)
 Fall 2016 record: 15-6
 Playing Facility: Trager Stadium (2000)
 Head Coach: Justine Sowry
 Conference Titles: 6 (2002, 2004, 2006, 2007, 2008, 2013)
 Conference Tournament Titles: 4 (1977, 1978, 2003, 2004)
 NCAA Appearances: 6
 Last NCAA Appearance: 2016
 All-Americans: 7

The UofL women's field hockey team received the NFHCA Division I National Academic Team Award for their 3.65 GPA, which was the highest in the nation.  The team also won two MAC tourney titles in 2003 and 2004 and finished one game back in their first Big East season. Between 2015 and 2017 Ayeisha McFerran was named three times as an NFHCA All-American while playing for the women's field hockey team. She was also a member of the Ireland team that played in the 2018 Women's Hockey World Cup final and was named Goalkeeper of the Tournament.

Football

 Team Established: 1912
 All Time Record: 514–469–17 (.523)
 2019 Season record: 8-5
 Playing Facility: Cardinal Stadium (1998)
 Head Coach: Scott Satterfield
 Conference Titles: 8
 Bowl Appearances: 23
 Last Bowl Appearance: 2019 Music City Bowl
 All-Americans: 29
 Drafted Players: 85
 Players In The NFL: 34
 Heisman Trophy Winners: 1

Under the guidance of head coaches John L. Smith (1998–2002) and Bobby Petrino (2003–2007), the Louisville football program went to nine consecutive bowl games, a streak that ended in the 2007 season. After a three-year hiatus under Coach Kragthorpe from 2007 to 2009 Louisville has been to eight consecutive bowl games under Coaches Charlie Strong and Bobby Petrino.

Under Coach Smith, the Cardinals spent 11 weeks in the AP Top 25, including a #17 final finish in 2000.

Under Coach Petrino, the Cardinals were ranked in all but three of the weekly AP polls since the beginning of the 2004 season. This includes a #6 final finish in both 2004 and 2006, as well as a #19 final finish in 2005.

In the 2004 season, the Cardinals went 11–1 and won the Conference USA Championship; their only loss was against third-ranked Miami, a game in which the Cardinals led by 17 in the third quarter before falling. The Cardinals went to the Liberty Bowl, where they defeated #10-ranked and previously-undefeated Boise State.

In 2005, the Cardinals finished 9–3 after falling to Virginia Tech in the Gator Bowl and completed the season ranked #19 in the AP Poll and #20 in the Coaches' Poll.

In 2006, the Cardinals began the season ranked #13 in the AP poll and finished the season with a 12–1 record, their first Big East Conference title and completed the season with a 24–13 victory over the Atlantic Coast Conference champion Wake Forest in the Orange Bowl. The Cards finished the 2006 season ranked #6 in the AP Poll and #7 in the Coaches Poll, while being ranked #6 in the Bowl Championship Series Poll.

On January 9, 2007, Steve Kragthorpe was introduced as the new head coach of the Cardinals, within 48 hours after Bobby Petrino announced his departure to take the head coaching position with the Atlanta Falcons of the National Football League. The Cardinals went 6–6 in Kragthorpe's first season and the second season 5–7. He was fired after his third season (2009) ended with a disappointing 4–8 record. Kragthorpe's replacement is Charlie Strong, formerly the defensive coordinator at Florida, and the second African American to head the Cardinals program.

None of the football program's recent success would have been possible without the vision and efforts of former Kentucky All-American and national champion coach (at the University of Miami) Howard Schnellenberger, who was the head coach from 1985 to 1994. His greatest achievement at U of L was a 34–7 victory over the Alabama Crimson Tide in the 1991 Fiesta Bowl (Alabama finished 7–5), which culminated in U of L's first national ranking (11th) and a 10–1–1 record.

The University of Louisville football program's home is Cardinal Stadium.

The UofL football program annually plays for the Governor's Cup (awarded to the winner of the Louisville-Kentucky football game) and The Keg of Nails (awarded to the winner of the annual Louisville-Cincinnati football game).

The film The Replacements was rumored to be based on former Cardinal quarterback Ed Rubbert (played by Keanu Reeves), who led the Washington Redskins' 1987 strike team to a 3–0 record en route to the franchise's Super Bowl XXII championship.

Retired jerseys 
 U of L has retired the jerseys (not the numbers) of the following former Cardinal football players: Bruce Armstrong, Ray Buchanan, Doug Buffone, Ernie Green, Tom Jackson, Joe Jacoby, Otto Knop, Lenny Lyles, Sam Madison, Frank Minnifield, Chris Redman, Otis Wilson, Roman Oben, Dwayne Woodruff, and Jeff Brohm.
 The only number retired by the Cardinals football program is 16, worn by Johnny Unitas.

Golf
 Distinguished amateur and now professional golfer Derek Fathauer enjoyed four solid seasons at Louisville as a Cardinal. He was the first player ever from the University of Louisville to be named an All-American.

Lacrosse
 Team Established: 2008
 All Time Record: 83–54 (.606)
 Spring 2015 record: 10–8
 Playing Facility: UofL Lacrosse Stadium (2006)
 Head Coach: Scott Teeter

Rowing
UofL is one of two universities in the state of Kentucky to have a women's rowing team, the other being Murray State University.
 Conference Titles: 3 (2009, 2011, 2014)

Soccer

Women's

 Team Established: 1985
 All Time Record: 221–293-38 (.400)
 Fall 2018 record: 12-7-0
 Playing Facility: Dr. Mark & Cindy Lynn Stadium (5300)
 Head Coach: Karen Ferguson-Dayes
 Conference Titles: 1 (2011)
 All Americans: 1

Men's

 Team Established: 1979
 All Time Record: 309–342–77 (.421)
 Playing Facility: Dr. Mark & Cindy Lynn Stadium (5300)
 Head Coach: John Michael Hayden
 Conference Titles: 4
 Conference Tournament Titles: 4 
 NCAA Tournament Appearances : 10
 Elite Eights : 3
 College Cup Appearances: 1 (2010)
 2010 National Runners Up

Louisville Finishes Historic Season as NCAA Runner-Up

The top-ranked Louisville men's soccer team fell 1–0 to Akron in the 2010 NCAA national championship game in front of 9,672 in Santa Barbara, Calif. The Cardinals, who appeared in the College Cup for the first time in program history, finished the season with a 20–1–3 overall record. Prior to reaching the NCAA Tournament, Louisville won the BIG EAST Red Division regular-season title and captured the BIG EAST Tournament title.

On February 21, 2013, U of L announced that it would build a new soccer-only stadium on campus. The new stadium, with a capacity of 5,300, is set to open for the 2014 season, and will be known as Dr. Mark and Cindy Lynn Stadium, after their donation of $5 million toward the $17.5 million project.

Softball

 Team Established: 2000
 All time record: 685–351 (.663)
 Playing Facility: Ulmer Stadium (2000; Capacity:2,200)
 Head Coach: [[Holly Aprile
 Conference championships: 4 (2004, 2006, 2012, 2014)
 Conference Tournament championships: 2 (2007, 2012)
 NCAA Tournament Appearances: 15
 Last NCAA Appearance: 2019
 All-Americans: 8

Swimming
Lousville men's swimming freshman record times as of March 2, 2022, include Abdelrahman Sameh in the 50 freestyle (19.31 in 2020), Murilo Sartori in the 100 freestyle (42.18 in 2022) and 200 freestyle (1:32.38 in 2022), and Daniel Sos in the 200 individual medley (1:43.40 in 2018). Olympians Denis Loktev and Denis Petrashov have also competed for the team.

Tennis

Men's :

 Coach- Rodrigo Da Silva
 Established- 1980
 Record- 576–401
 Conference Championships- 5 (2000, 2006, 2010, 2011, 2012)
 NCAA appearances – 7 – most recent (08-09)

Volleyball

 Team Established: 1975
 All Time Record: 900–446
 Playing Facility: KFC Yum! Center (opened 2010, first used 2011); L&N Federal Credit Union Arena (1990)
 Record at KFC Yum! Center: 17–6
 Record at L&N Federal Credit Union Arena: 157–19
 Head Coach: Dani Busboom Kelly
 Conference Titles: 23 (1982, 1990, 1991, 1992, 1993, 1994, 1995, 1996, 1998, 1999, 2002, 2003, 2004, 2005, 2007, 2011, 2012, 2013, 2015, 2017, 2020, 2021, 2022)
 Conference Tournament Titles: 10 (1998, 2000, 2003, 2004, 2006, 2008, 2009, 2010, 2012, 2015)
 NCAA Tournament Appearances: 27
 National runner-up: 2022
 Final Four: 2021, 2022
 Regional Finals: 2019, 2021, 2022
 Last NCAA Appearance: 2022
 All-Americans: 27

Volleyball has traditionally been one of UofL's most successful programs, led for 15 years by head coach Leonid Yelin, whose .772 career winning percentage ranked 9th among active coaches prior to his retirement after the 2010 season. He was replaced by former U of L player Anne Kordes, who had spent the previous seven seasons as head coach at Saint Louis. During the 2005 season, UofL was ranked as high as #6 en route to a 30–3 record, a regular season tie for the Big East title, and a second straight trip to the Sweet 16. In the most recent 2012 season, the team averaged 2,341 fans while playing mainly at the KFC Yum! Center. Their traditional home of Cardinal Arena, with 840 seats, has become too small for the team's current popularity, with fans turned away at several games. While U of L has sought state funding to expand Cardinal Arena to better meet fan demands and prevent unsafe "standing room only" crowds, it has more recently opted to move full-time into the KFC Yum! Center; of its 19 home matches in the 2012 season, 15 were scheduled for that facility. U of L also hosted both the 2005 Big East Volleyball tournament and the first two rounds of NCAA volleyball tournament at the Kentucky International Expo Center in Downtown Louisville, and hosted the Women's Final Four in 2012 at the KFC Yum! Center.

In 2005, two Cardinals, seniors Lena Ustymenko and Jennifer Hoffman, were named second team All-American. Previously only one Big East volleyball player had been named an All-American.  Ustymenko was also named the 2005 Big East player of the year and Hoffman led the nation in hitting percentage in the Card's 6–2 offense.  The program has won 15 of its last 16 conference titles (with another in 1983) and has been to the NCAA tourney 17 times since 1982, with 47 players making their all-conference team. The team has a 157–19 all-time record at Cardinal Arena, and is 17–6 at the KFC Yum! Center.

The Cardinal volleyball team has won conference championships 19 times, from Metro, C-USA, Big East, American Athletic, and ACC.

More recently, after the Cardinals joined the ACC in 2014, the Cardinals won the 2015 ACC title, the first ACC crown ever won by any Louisville team. Senior setter Katie George, also notable as that year's Miss Kentucky USA, was named ACC Player of the Year and Setter of the Year. In addition, Kordes was named Coach of the Year, and libero Molly Sauer was named Defensive Player of the Year and Freshman of the Year.

The Cardinal volleyball team moved back into the newly expanded Cardinal Arena in 2017. In April 2019, the local L&N Federal Credit Union donated $2 million to the athletic program, leading the university to rename the venue L&N Federal Credit Union Arena.

In 2021, the Cardinals won the ACC title and entered the NCAA tournament undefeated. Setter Tori Dilfer and middle blocker Anna Stevenson were named first-team All-Americans by the American Volleyball Coaches Association, becoming the program's first-ever first-team All-Americans, and outside hitter Anna DeBeer was named a third-team All-American. Dilfer was also named ACC Setter of the Year. The Cardinals' only loss was in the national semifinals to eventual champion Wisconsin.

Ladybirds 
The University of Louisville Ladybirds dance team has won 20 national titles. The Ladybirds have won nine of the last ten national competitions, including the last four years, in the National Cheerleading Association Championships in Daytona Beach, Fla. The Ladybirds also added the 2014, 2016, 2017 Hip Hop national title to their trophy case. In the years 2016-18 the Ladybirds won a double title, placing first in both the team performance and hip hop categories. UofL won the Universal Dance Association title in 1995 and 1997. The Ladybirds have long been successful, placing in the top five in their national competition 21 of the last 27 years. The group is under the direction of Sheryl Knight.

Championships

NCAA team championships
Louisville has won 3 NCAA team national championships.

Men's (3)
Basketball (3): 1980, 1986, 2013 (vacated)
see also:
ACC NCAA team championships
List of NCAA schools with the most NCAA Division I championships

Other team championships
Men's (2)
National Invitation Tournament Basketball (1): 1956
National Association of Intercollegiate Basketball Basketball (1): 1948

Notable non varsity sports

Ice Hockey
The University of Louisville Ice Hockey team was founded in 1995. The University of Louisville Hockey team is a club sport, participating in the Southeast Conference in Division II of the American Collegiate Hockey Association and also the TSCHL. Louisville has 3 back to back TSCHL championships in 2015, 2016, and 2017. They also have 2 ACHA Southeast Regional Appearances (2016, 2017). Recent success can be contributed to recent additions such as coach Brian Graham, who is a two time TSCHL Coach of the Year (2015, 2016), and captain Yannis Soukas, who is the Cardinals' all-time leader in points, winner of the 2016 TSCHL MVP Award, 2016 TSCHL Rookie of the Year Award, and was named to the 1st team All-Conference in 2016, 2017, and 2018.

Rugby
The University of Louisville Rugby Club was re-founded in 2009, and was promoted to Division II of college rugby in 2011.  Louisville Rugby is led by head coach Eric Raney.
Louisville Rugby has an active recruiting program, yielding recruits from Kentucky high school rugby all stars. Louisville offers scholarships and grants, funded by the Louisville Rugby Old Boys' Association, to incoming rugby recruits.

Director's Cup
The University of Louisville has risen from 174th in the Director's Cup standings in 1999–2000 to 28th in 2006–07. U of L finished the 2015–16 year ranked 29th in the NACDA Learfield Sports Directors' Cup.

All-time records by sports

Sport facilities

Average per-game attendance by sport

Fan support

Attendance ranks are based on average per home game.

In 2005, UofL was among only a handful of schools to average better than 97 percent attendance to capacity in volleyball, men's basketball, and football.

Radio affiliates

The broadcast team for Louisville men's basketball is Paul Rogers (play-by-play) and Bob Valvano or Doug Ormay (color analyst). The broadcast team for Louisville football is Paul Rogers (play-by-play); Craig Swabek (color analyst) and Doug Ormay (sideline reporter).

U of L games are broadcast in Lexington KY on WWRW 105.5 FM and WKRD 790 AM & 101.7- Louisville, KY (Flagship Station)

For Women's basketball, Women's Play by play is provided by Jim Kelch, with Adrienne Johnson as the color analyst. All Women's Basketball games are heard on WKRD 790 AM or on FM 101.7 in Louisville.

SIRIUS Satellite Radio Louisville broadcasts
SIRIUS Satellite Radio, Nelligan Sports Marketing, the University of Louisville and CSTV: College Sports Television announced an agreement on January 10, 2005, making SIRIUS the Official Satellite Radio Partner of the University of Louisville. SIRIUS will broadcast select play-by-play sports of Louisville's nationally ranked college basketball and football teams
 2011 U of L Football Games on Sirius Satellite Radio
 2011–12 U of L Men's

Rivalries

Kentucky Wildcats

The Louisville Cardinals rivalry with the Kentucky Wildcats is widely considered one of the most intense college rivalries in the United States.  The men's basketball game is called the Battle for the Bluegrass; the football game is officially called the Governor's Cup.

In the early years after the rivalry resumed whoever would win the football game would go on to lose the basketball game. In 2003 Louisville broke that tradition by winning both the football and basketball game and did so again in 2012. Kentucky has completed the double four times, in the 2009, 2011, 2018 and 2019 seasons.

Unlike many in-state rivalries that have been played continuously for many decades, these two schools went through a long period from the 1930s to the 1980s of rarely facing one another. They did play frequently from the 1900s to the 1920s. Since the renewal of the men's basketball rivalry in 1983–84 UK leads the modern rivalry 28–13 and the all-time series 37–16. Since the two teams resumed playing football in 1994, U of L leads the modern series 15–11 but the all-time series is led by UK at 17–15.

Within the intrastate rivalry with the Kentucky Wildcats, the team that has won the football game has lost the following basketball game every year, except in 2003 and 2012 (when UofL won both) and 2009, 2011, 2018 and 2019 (when UK won both).

Cincinnati Bearcats
Known more for an intense basketball rivalry and tradition, U of L and UC have a football rivalry that has stretched over the span of four conferences from the Missouri Valley Conference, to the Metro Conference to Conference USA, and more recently in the Big East Conference, which in 2013 was renamed to the American Athletic Conference. It is believed to be the oldest rivalry for the Louisville football team and the second oldest for Cincinnati, only behind the annual game with the Miami RedHawks.

On the gridiron, the two teams compete for the Keg of Nails, currently held by Louisville as winner of the most recent game in the 2022 season. The Bearcats lead the overall series 30-22-1.

Other Rivalries
Louisville also has dormant rivalries with University of Memphis Tigers and Marquette University, which have been on hiatus since 2017 and 2018, respectively.

See also
 Sports in Louisville, Kentucky
 List of University of Louisville people

References

External links